Kleyevsky is a rural locality (a khutor) in Komsomolskoye Rural Settlement, Novonikolayevsky District, Volgograd Oblast, Russia. The population was 47 as of 2010.

Geography 
Kleyevsky is located in steppe, on the Khopyorsko-Buzulukskaya Plain, near the Kleyevsky pond, 16 km northeast of Novonikolayevsky (the district's administrative centre) by road. Komsomolsky is the nearest rural locality.

References 

Rural localities in Novonikolayevsky District